The Frank J. Selke Memorial Trophy is awarded annually to the most sportsmanlike player in the Quebec Major Junior Hockey League. The award began in the 1969–70 season as a team trophy awarded to the league's West Division champions. It has been awarded in its present form since 1970–71 after just one season. The award is named after former NHL general manager and Hall of Famer Frank J. Selke.

Winners

External links
 QMJHL official site List of trophy winners.

Quebec Major Junior Hockey League trophies and awards